Beautiful People may refer to:

Film, television, and theater 
 Beautiful People (film), a 1999 British comedy
 Beautiful People (1974 film) or Animals Are Beautiful People, a South African wildlife documentary
 Beautiful People (American TV series), a 2005 drama series
 Beautiful People (British TV series), a 2008 sitcom
 The Beautiful People (audio play), a 2007 Doctor Who – The Companion Chronicles audio play
 The Beautiful People (play), a 1941 play by William Saroyan
 Beautiful People, the working title for the 2014 film Dead House

Music

Performers 
 Beautiful People (band), a 1990s UK Jimi Hendrix tribute act
 120 Days, originally The Beautiful People, a 2001-2012 Norwegian band

Albums 
 Beautiful People (album), by The New Seekers, 1971
 Beautiful People, or the 1967 title song, by Kenny O'Dell, 1968
 The Beautiful People (album), by SiM, 2016
 Beautiful People: The Greatest Hits of Melanie, a compilation album by Melanie, 1999

Songs 
 "Beautiful People" (Australian Crawl song), 1979
 "Beautiful People" (Barbara Tucker song), 1994
 "Beautiful People" (Big Country song), 1991
 "Beautiful People" (Chris Brown song), 2011
 "Beautiful People" (Ed Sheeran song), 2019
 "Beautiful People" (Pet Shop Boys song), 2009
 "Beautiful People", by ASAP Ferg from Always Strive and Prosper, 2016
 "Beautiful People", by Carolina Liar from Wild Blessed Freedom, 2011
 "Beautiful People", by Mark Pritchard, with vocals by Thom Yorke, 2016
 "Beautiful People", by Melanie from Affectionately Melanie, 1969; also recorded by The New Seekers (1971)
 "Beautiful People", by Rusted Root from When I Woke, 1994
 "Beautiful People", by Stress, 1991
 "The Beautiful People" (song), by Marilyn Manson, 1996
 "The Beautiful People", by Tom Sankey from The Golden Screw, 1967

Other uses 
 Beautiful People (manga), an anthology of short stories by Mitsukazu Mihara
 BeautifulPeople.com, a dating website
 The Beautiful People (professional wrestling), a professional wrestling stable
 The Beautiful People (book), by Marylin Bender, 1967
 The Beautiful People, a 1952 short story by Charles Beaumont

See also
 "Beautiful People Beautiful Problems", a song by Lana Del Rey
 Beauty
 Jet set